Yoko Ota may refer to:

 Yōko Ōta, a Japanese female writer
 Yoko Hunnicutt, née Ota, a Japanese female athlete